The Jennys Lane Historic District is a residential historic district encompassing a well-preserved subdivision in Barrington, Rhode Island, which was developed between 1860 and 1920.  It is representative of the town's development as a suburb of Providence following the introduction of passenger rail service in 1855.  The district includes all of the properties on Jennys Lane, as well as some adjacent houses on Mathewson and Rumstick Roads, as well as a boathouse on Rumstick Road on the banks of the Barrington River.

The district was listed on the National Register of Historic Places in 2008.

See also
National Register of Historic Places listings in Bristol County, Rhode Island

References

Georgian architecture in Rhode Island
Historic districts in Bristol County, Rhode Island
Barrington, Rhode Island
Historic districts on the National Register of Historic Places in Rhode Island
National Register of Historic Places in Bristol County, Rhode Island